The Varna Ratnakara, (IAST: Varṇa Ratnākara), literally "Ocean of description", is the oldest prose work of Maithili language, written in 1324 CE by the Maithil scholar, priest and poet Jyotirishwar Thakur. The author was a part of the court of King Harisimhadeva (r. 1304–1324) of the Karnat dynasty whose capitals were in both Simraungadh (now in Nepal) and Darbhanga (now in Bihar, India).

This work contains descriptions of various subjects and situations. This work provides valuable information about the life and culture of medieval India. An incomplete list of 84 Siddhas is found in the text, which consists only 76 names. A manuscript of this text is preserved in the Asiatic Society, Kolkata

The word Abahattha was used for the very first time in this encyclopedic work. Later the Maithili poet Vidyapati wrote his poem Kīrttilatā in Abahatta.

Author
Thakur was born in a Brahmin family. He was the court poet of King Harisimhadeva of Karnata dynasty of Mithila.

References

Hindu texts
13th-century books
Maithili literature